Aurangzebpur is a small village in Saharanpur District, Uttar Pradesh, Aurnagzebpur also known by another name Nazeebpur, this village has a small population dominated by Muslims almost 99% population is Muslim, Located on Saharanpur-Chilkana road. 
Aurangzebpur is not connected to the main road, but has the connectivity through "PM Garamin Sadak Yojna". to the Chilkana Road.

Padhaan is the Strongest Clan (Family) in the village. Nearest villages to Aurangzebpur are Ghathera, Buddhakhera, Katla and Patni. Most Population in the village belongs to Gada or Gour.

References

Villages in Saharanpur district